Prutton is a surname. Notable people with the surname include:

Carl F. Prutton (1898–1970), American chemist and inventor
David Prutton (born 1981), British footballer